J. D. Williams (born 1978) is an American actor.

J. D. Williams may also refer to:
 J. D. Williams (admiral) (born 1935), vice admiral in the United States Navy
 J. D. Williams (Idaho politician) (born 1942), Idaho politician
 J. D. Williams (Wyoming politician), Wyoming politician
 JD Williams & Company Ltd, now part of N Brown Group
 James Dixon Williams (1877–1934), American film producer and studio executive
 James D. Williams (1808–1880), Indiana politician
 James D. Williams (Pennsylvania politician) (1943–1985)
 James Williams (defensive back) (born 1967), American football coach and former cornerback also known as J.D. Williams